Consequences is The Missionary Position's second album, released in March 2012. It features songs written by Jeff Angell and Benjamin Anderson.

Consequences was recorded in Seattle, Washington

Track listing
 Please Don't Leave
 White Knuckles
 Leave The Motor Running
 The Objects In The Mirror
 One Eye Open
 The Key
 Every Man For Himself
 The Neon City Night Club
 How It Feels
 Outside Looking In
 Everything All Over Me
 When I Fall Apart
 Money to Burn

Credits 
Jeff Angell - Vocals, Guitars
Benjamin Anderson - Piano, Key Bass, Organ, Piano, Vocals
Gregor Lothian - Saxophone
Michael Alex - Drums

Additional musicians

Barrett Martin (Screaming Trees) (Mad Season) - Percussion, Upright Bass "When I Fall Apart"
Kris Geren - Guitar on "When I Fall Apart"
Kolleen Klann - Backing Vocals on "When I Fall Apart"
John Benedetti - Trumpet on "Please Don't Leave" and Flugelhorn on "White Knuckles"
Recorded by Benjamin Anderson and Jeff Angell, in Seattle, Washington.
Mixed by Benjamin Anderson at 2614 Western Ave, Seattle, Washington.
Mastered by Brad Blackwood at Euphonic Masters in Memphis, Tennessee.

References

External links 

  Official Missionary Position Band
  The Boredom Killing Business
  The Missionary Position "Consequences" one sheet

2012 albums
The Missionary Position (band) albums